Popovičky is a municipality and village in Prague-East District in the Central Bohemian Region of the Czech Republic. It has about 400 inhabitants.

Administrative parts
Villages of Chomutovice and Nebřenice are administrative parts of Popovičky.

Geography
It lies in the Benešov Uplands. Tha Chomutovický Stream of local importance flows across the municipality.

History
The first written mention of Popovičky is from 1352. Chomutovice was first mentioned in 1205 and Nebřenice in 1437.

Sport
There is a modern golf course in Nebřenice.

Sights
The landmark of Popovičky is the Church of Saint Bartholomew. The originally medieval church was completely baroque rebuilt in 1731–1736.

The Nebřenice Chateau was built as a hunting lodge in the early 19th century. Today, it is the seat of the golf clubhouse.

Gallery

References

External links

Villages in Prague-East District